General elections were held in Nicaragua on 3 October 1920 to elect a President, half of the Deputies and one-third of the Senators of the National Congress.

By 1920, the State Department believed that electoral competition between Liberals and Conservatives without direct U.S. occupation would provide a better basis for political stability and the long-term protection of U.S. economic interests".

During the four years following the 1916 elections, the Liberals criticized the Department of State for its support of an electoral machinery that tended to perpetuate the power of the Conservatives who controlled it. The Liberals claimed that since the elections were manipulated to their disadvantage and since the United States would not countenance revolution, it was impossible for them ever to secure control of the Government. Early in 1920 the Department of State suggested that the Nicaraguan Government invite someone to make a study of the electoral system and suggest possible revisions therein. President Emiliano Chamorro Vargas replied that it was inopportune to make any changes, since the existing electoral law amply provided for free elections and the proximity of the elections would not permit a thorough study.

The liberals did participate in the 1920 elections, but the backing of the United States and a fraudulent vote count assured the election of Emiliano Chamorro Vargas's uncle, Diego Manuel Chamorro.

The 1920 elections had the benefit of an American observer, Major Jesse I. Miller, who was sent by the State Department.

Results

President

References

Bibliography
 Barquero, Sara L. Gobernantes de Nicaragua, 1825-1947. Managua: Publicaciones del Ministerio de Instrucción Pública. Second edition. 1945.
 Elections in the Americas A Data Handbook Volume 1. North America, Central America, and the Caribbean. Edited by Dieter Nohlen. 2005.
 MacRenato, Ternot. Somoza: seizure of power, 1926-1939. La Jolla: University of California, San Diego. 1991.
 Merrill, Tim L., Nicaragua : a country study. Washington: Federal Research Division, Library of Congress. 1994.
 Smith, Hazel. Nicaragua: self-determination and survival. London : Pluto Press. 1993.
 United States . Department of State. The United States and Nicaragua: a survey of the relations from 1909 to 1932. Washington, D.C.: Government Printing Office. 1932.
 Vargas, Oscar-René. Elecciones presidenciales en Nicaragua, 1912-1932: análisis socio-político. Managua: Fundación Manolo Morales. 1989.

Elections in Nicaragua
Nicaragua
1920 in Nicaragua
Presidential elections in Nicaragua
October 1920 events
Election and referendum articles with incomplete results